Thornton John Cleaver Jr. (September 26, 1944 – December 1, 2022), better known as Skip Cleaver, was an American politician in the state of New Hampshire.

Early life
Cleaver was born in Clearfield, Pennsylvania, on September 26, 1944.

Education
Cleaver earned a B.S. in political science and history and an M.B.A. international business from Rivier University.

Military career
Cleaver served from 1965 to 1971 in the United States Marine Corps.

Political career
On November 8, 2016, Cleaver was elected to the New Hampshire House of Representatives where he represented the Hillsborough 35 district. Cleaver assumed office in 2016. Cleaver was a Democrat. Cleaver endorsed Bernie Sanders in the 2020 Democratic Party presidential primaries.

Personal life and death
Since 1975 Cleaver resided in Nashua, New Hampshire. Cleaver was married, had three children, and four grandchildren.

Cleaver died in Keene, New Hampshire, on December 1, 2022, at the age of 78.

References

1944 births
2022 deaths
Rivier University alumni
People from Clearfield, Pennsylvania
Military personnel from Pennsylvania
Politicians from Nashua, New Hampshire
Democratic Party members of the New Hampshire House of Representatives
21st-century American politicians